Drouetius is a monotypic genus of click beetle. Its only described species, Alestrus dolosus is endemic to the Azores archipelago.

References

Endemic arthropods of the Azores
Elateridae
Beetles described in 1867